Suzanne Lyn Barker-Collo is a New Zealand neuropsychology academic, and as of 2019 is a full professor at the University of Auckland.

Academic career

After a 1997 PhD titled A Model of  Posttraumatic Stress Reactions to Sexual Abuse in Females at Lakehead University in Canada, Barker-Collo moved to the University of Auckland, rising to full professor.

Barker-Collo has been involved in a number of very-large scale systematic analyses based on the Global Burden of Disease Study.

References

External links
  

Living people
New Zealand women academics
Year of birth missing (living people)
Lakehead University alumni
Academic staff of the University of Auckland
New Zealand medical researchers